Verde Vallis is an ancient river valley in the Sinus Sabaeus quadrangle on Mars.  It is found in the Sinus Sabaeus quadrangle at 0.5° south latitude and 330.2° west longitude.  It is named after a river in Arizona, USA.

References

See also

 Geology of Mars
 Vallis (planetary geology)
 Water on Mars

Valleys and canyons on Mars
Sinus Sabaeus quadrangle